is a former Japanese football player. He is also a former futsal player.

Club career
Hirabayashi was born in Inazawa on June 4, 1984. He joined Nagoya Grampus Eight from youth team in 2003. However he could hardly play in the match and he moved to Sagan Tosu in September 2006. In 2007, he moved to Japan Football League (JFL) club FC Kariya. He became a regular player and played many matches. He left the club end of 2008 season.

He played futsal from 2009 to 2011 while he could not find a transfer destination club. He played for his local club Nagoya Oceans in F.League. He played in 2 seasons and the club won the champions both seasons.

In April 2011, he signed with JFL club Zweigen Kanazawa and came back as football player. He moved to Regional Leagues club Renofa Yamaguchi FC in 2013. The club was promoted to JFL, J3 League and J2 League every season until 2016. He retired end of 2016 season.

National team career
In September 2001, Hirabayashi was selected Japan U-17 national team for 2001 U-17 World Championship. He played 2 matches.

Club statistics

References

External links

Profile at Renofa Yamaguchi FC

1984 births
Living people
People from Inazawa
Association football people from Aichi Prefecture
Japanese footballers
Japan youth international footballers
J1 League players
J2 League players
J3 League players
Japan Football League players
Nagoya Grampus players
Sagan Tosu players
FC Kariya players
Zweigen Kanazawa players
Renofa Yamaguchi FC players
Association football midfielders